Saint-Marcouf is a commune in the Calvados department in the Normandy region in northwestern France.

History
The commune takes its name from Saint Marcouf, evangelizer of the Cotentin Peninsula.

Population

See also
Communes of the Calvados department

References

Communes of Calvados (department)
Calvados communes articles needing translation from French Wikipedia